Romaine Vinton Goddard, Baroness von Overbeck ( – ) was an American woman who married the German diplomat Gustav von Overbeck.  She was the first American woman to become a maharani, of the territory of Sabah in present-day Malaysia.

Romaine Vinton Goddard was born in Ohio, one of two children of Daniel Convers Goddard, deputy secretary of the Interior, and poet and novelist Sarah Madeline Vinton.  Goddard died when his daughter was three years old and his widow and her two children moved to Washington, D.C.  In 1865, Madeline Goddard married Admiral John A. Dahlgren.

Goddard attended the Mount de Chantal Visitation Academy, a Catholic girls' school in Wheeling, West Virginia, from 1857 to 1859.  She was their first student to specialize in the harp and graduated with honors in both harp and piano.  In 1862, George Peter Alexander Healy painted her portrait playing the harp.

On March 16, 1870, Goddard married Gustav von Overbeck, a German diplomat.  Despite a winter storm, the wedding was a leading social event in Washington, with guests including US President Ulysses S. Grant.  They would have three children: Convers (b. 1871), Oscar (b. 1873), and Alfred (b. 1877).  Initially the couple lived in Germany, but while Overbeck was doing business in Asia, she was left to her own devices, living in Europe or Washington, DC.  She assumed the title Baroness when her husband was made a Baron in 1873, and the title maharani in 1877 when her husband was made Maharajah of Sabah, Rajah of Gaya and Sandakan by Abdul Momin, the Sultan of Brunei.  Eventually they separated, but never divorced.  He died in 1894.

In December 1875 at a reception at the Germany embassy in Washington, DC, she met the German pianist Hans von Bülow.  Bülow fell madly in love with her and wrote her a series of increasingly tortured love letters.  The exact nature of their relationship is unknown as only his letters to her are known to exist, and not any responses she may have written.  Her mother's novel A Washington Winter (1893) contains a sub-plot which was likely inspired by Bülow’s pursuit of Goddard.

Her children and other descendants of her grandfather Samuel Finley Vinton engaged in a decades long legal battle (Von Overbeck v. Dahlgren) over his substantial estate, which lasted from his death in 1862 until 1928.

References 

Created via preloaddraft
1848 births
1926 deaths